Risto Kalevi Aaltonen (16 March 1939 – 8 March 2021) was a Finnish actor.

Aaltonen was born in Helsinki. He became known in Finland for his roles as Kalle in the sixties series Hanski and for his role as a gangster in the 1969 comedy film Leikkikalugangsteri. In the 1960s and 1970s he also did some work as a film and theatre director. On stage, one of his memorable roles was Zhdanov in David Pownall's Master Class which was given over 200 times at the Finnish National Theatre in the late 1980s.


Filmography

Film

TV

Dubbing (in Finnish)

References

External links

1939 births
2021 deaths
Male actors from Helsinki
Finnish male film actors
Finnish male television actors
Finnish theatre directors
20th-century Finnish male actors
21st-century Finnish male actors